KACZ (96.3 FM, "Z 96.3") is a Top 40 (CHR) formatted radio station owned by Manhattan Broadcasting Company. The station is broadcast from Manhattan, Kansas, with an ERP of 12.5 kW with its COL as Riley, Kansas. The station serves the Manhattan-Junction City-Fort Riley area, as well as portions of Northeast Kansas. Their slogan is "The #1 Hit Music Station."

KACZ is part of Manhattan Broadcasting Company, which also owns KMAN (News Talk/Sports), KXBZ (Hot Country), KMKF (Rock), and KBLS (Adult Contemporary).  Corey Reeves serves as the General Manager and Andrea Besthorn is the Sales Manager.  Chris Swick is KACZ's Program Director.

Richard Wartell was the long-time GM of the company, retiring on November 12, 2015, after nearly thirty years on the job.  It was under Wartell's watch that KACZ first went on the air.

Programming
Currently, the station airs Elvis Duran and the Morning Show. The station has aired the show since early 2014, replacing "Kidd Kraddick in the Morning" shortly after Kraddick's untimely death.  The airstaff also features Jen (10a-2p), Swick (2p-7p), and Grace (7p-12a).  Weekend programming includes the "American Top 40 Countdown".

External links
 KACZ official website 
 

ACZ
Contemporary hit radio stations in the United States
Radio stations established in 2001
2001 establishments in Kansas